Fudbalski klub Proleter Zrenjanin is a football club from the city of Zrenjanin, Vojvodina, Serbia.

History

Early period

Soon after World War II, the club almost achieved promotion to the Yugoslav Second League after finishing top of the regional Serbian League (a 3rd tier back then). The most important footballers responsible for this were Hirman, Kirćanski and Herceg. They didn't win the qualification matches, but in the next season, they ended up selected to participate in the Third national League, after a league system reorganisation. The following year, in 1951, the club achieved the quarter-finals of the Yugoslav Cup. Those matches against Dinamo Zagreb were played by Cikoš, Mosorinski, Ninkov, Vinčić, Prodanović, Davidović, Sokolovački, Kirćanski, Radojčić, Ajnberger and Petrov.

With the direction of Radivoje "Koče" Kolarov the main focus was given with the development of the youth squads. Many squad members were selected to play in the regional Vojvodina selection. The "Golden boys" of that period were Grubački, Rasić, Đuričin, Sokrić, Radlovački, Šporin, Mesaroš, Vlatković, Medan, Šubin and Mirkov. Milan Galić and Radoslav Bečejac came later. As champions of Vojvodina regional League they played the access to the Yugoslav Second League but that failed to manage the promotion once again.

In 1954 the club plays in the 3rd League. The team is formed by Martinović, Desnica, Đuričin, Vratnjan, Fratucan, Omeragić, Begović, Anić, Popov, Aćamović, Galić, Veselinov, Tamaši and Kerekeš. That generation was considered to have many chances to achieve the promotion to the First League. The main obstacle came from FK Sarajevo that despite being defeated by 2–1 the club needed a goal difference in that final match to be bigger that two. The club stayed in the lower leagues and the next promotion was made to the Yugoslav Second League and the players in that achieved it were Filep, Kerekeš, Čepski, Tamaši, Dimković, Rus, Kron, Zlatc, Milošev, Bečejac and Šutović.

The club was relegated in summer 1975 and returned to the Yugoslav First League in summer 1990.

1990s
Proleter Zrenjanin was the founding member of First League of FR Yugoslavia in 1992–93 season.

It played at UEFA Intertoto Cup 1997.

2000s
It participated in First League until relegated in summer 2000. It failed to promote a year later because it just finished the 2nd in Second League. In summer 2002, Proleter was relegated to Third League and returned to Second League a year later. Proleter relegated again in summer 2005.

In order back to First League, Proleter Zrenjanin merged with First League club FK Budućnost Banatski Dvor and formed FK Banat Zrenjanin.

But the new club would use Proleter's Karađorđev Park Stadium.

2006
Shortly after the closing of the FK Proleter, the group of his former players, led by Amir Teljigović and Dragan Jović founded a club called FK Proleter 2006 The club considers itself the successor of the old Proleter. First few years the club is committed to the development of younger players category, in 2012. was created in the senior team, currently competing in the Area league of Zrenjanin called PFL Zrenjanin, the fifth rank of the competition in the country.

Recent seasons
{|class="wikitable"
|-bgcolor="#efefef"
!Season
!League
!Pos.
!Pl.
!W
!D
!L
!GS
!GA
!P
!Cup
!Notes
!Manager
|-
|1989–90
|bgcolor=#ffa07a|2
|align=right bgcolor=silver|2
|align=right|38||align=right|23||align=right|6 (4)||align=right|9
|align=right|55||align=right|30||align=right|50
|did not qualify
|1
|
|-
|1990–91
|1
|align=right |5
|align=right|36||align=right|17||align=right|4||align=right|15
|align=right|50||align=right|49||align=right|35
|Quarter-finals
|
|
|-
|1991–92
|1
|align=right |5
|align=right|33||align=right|16||align=right|4 (3)||align=right|13
|align=right|41||align=right|43||align=right|35
|Last 16
|1
|
|-
|1992–93
|1
|align=right |9
|align=right|36||align=right|15||align=right|6||align=right|15
|align=right|43||align=right|45||align=right|36
|Last 32
|
|
|-
|rowspan="2"|1993–94
|1A fall
|align=right |5
|align=right|18||align=right|7||align=right|4||align=right|7
|align=right|33||align=right|26||align=right|18
|rowspan="2"|Quarter-finals
|
|rowspan="2"|
|-
|1A spring
|align=right |9
|align=right|18||align=right|4||align=right|3||align=right|11
|align=right|8||align=right|28||align=right|18
|relegated to 1B
|-
|rowspan="2"|1994–95
|1B fall
|align=right |5 (15)
|align=right|18||align=right|6||align=right|3||align=right|9
|align=right|22||align=right|24||align=right|15
|rowspan="2" bgcolor=#cc9966|Semi-finals
|
|rowspan="2"|
|-
|1B spring
|align=right|3 (13)
|align=right|18||align=right|8||align=right|4||align=right|6
|align=right|30||align=right|27||align=right|24
|promoted to 1A
|-
|rowspan="2"|1995–96
|1A fall
|align=right |6
|align=right|18||align=right|6||align=right|3||align=right|9
|align=right|19||align=right|31||align=right|21
|rowspan="2"|Last 16
|rowspan="2"|
|rowspan="2"|
|-
|1A spring
|align=right |8
|align=right|18||align=right|6||align=right|3||align=right|9
|align=right|24||align=right|28||align=right|27
|-
|1996–97
|1A
|align=right |5
|align=right|33||align=right|12||align=right|6||align=right|15
|align=right|48||align=right|46||align=right|42
|Quarter-finals
|
|
|-
|1997–98
|1A
|align=right |9
|align=right|33||align=right|10||align=right|2||align=right|21
|align=right|40||align=right|64||align=right|32
|Last 32
|
|
|-
|1998–99
|1
|align=right |6
|align=right|24||align=right|10||align=right|5||align=right|9
|align=right|29||align=right|29||align=right|35
|Last 32
|2
|
|-
|1999–00
|1
|align=right |17
|align=right|40||align=right|12||align=right|10||align=right|18
|align=right|36||align=right|49||align=right|46
|Last 64
|Relegated
|
|-
|2000–01
|bgcolor=#ffa07a|2 – North
|align=right bgcolor=silver|2
|align=right|34||align=right|23||align=right|7||align=right|4
|align=right|66||align=right|26||align=right|76
|Last 64
|
|
|-
|2001–02
|bgcolor=#ffa07a|2 – North
|align=right |10
|align=right|34||align=right|16||align=right|4||align=right|14
|align=right|51||align=right|33||align=right|52
|Last 64
|
|
|-
|2002–03
|bgcolor=#98bb98|3 – Vojvodina
|align=right |10
|align=right|34||align=right|27||align=right|4||align=right|3
|align=right|76||align=right|26||align=right|85
|did not qualify
|Promoted to 2 North
|
|-
|2003–04
|bgcolor=#ffa07a|2 – North
|align=right |10
|align=right|36||align=right|19||align=right|5||align=right|12
|align=right|58||align=right|38||align=right|62
|did not qualify
|
|
|-
|2004–05
|bgcolor=#ffa07a|2 – Serbia
|align=right |18
|align=right|38||align=right|11||align=right|7||align=right|20
|align=right|38||align=right|59||align=right|40
|did not qualify
|Losing relegation Playoffs
|
|-
|2005–06
|bgcolor=#98bb98|3 – Vojvodina
|align=right |Withdrew
|align=right|–||align=right|–||align=right|–||align=right|–
|align=right|–||align=right|–||align=right|–
|did not qualify
|Merged in January 2006
|-
|}

1 After draws penalties were taken, and only the winner of the
penalty shoot-out was rewarded with a point.

2 Championship abandoned officially on 14 May 1999 due to the NATO bombing of Yugoslavia.

Notable former players
This is a list of FK Proleter Zrenjanin players with senior national team appearances:

 Yugoslavia /  FR Yugoslavia/Serbia and Montentenegro /  Serbia
 Radoslav Bebić
Radoslav Bečejac
Nenad Bjeković
 Radivoje Drašković
Slobodan Dubajić
Milan Galić
Dejan Govedarica
 Đuro Ivančević
Vladimir Ivić
Ilija Ivić
Predrag Jovanović
 Dragiša Kosnić
Darko Kovačević

 Predrag Luburić 
 Zlatomir Mićanović
Žarko Olarević
 Kemal Omeragić
 Milenko Rus
 Zvonimir Vukić
 Žarko Soldo
 Delivoje Šarenac
 Milan Šarović
 Mirko Todorović
 Arsen Tošić
Duško Tošić
 Sreten Vasić
 Aleksandar Zelenović
 Milorad Zorić

Other
 Velibor Đurić
 Nenad Mišković
 Amir Teljigović
 Nikica Maglica
 Milan Stojanoski
 Marko Baša
 Vladimir Božović
 Aleksandar Rodić
 Zlatko Zahovič

For the list of all players with Wikipedia article, please see :Category:FK Proleter Zrenjanin players.

Supporters
The supporters are known as Indijanci Petrovgrad.

Other sports
Proleter Zrenjanin also has handball, swimming, water polo and basketball section.

References

External links

 Official website
 Copy of former club's official website at yusport.tripod.com.

 
Association football clubs established in 1947
Association football clubs disestablished in 2006
Defunct football clubs in Serbia
Football clubs in Yugoslavia
Football clubs in Vojvodina
FK Proleter Zrenjanin
1947 establishments in Serbia
2006 disestablishments in Serbia